The San Francisco Motorcycle Club (SFMC) was founded in San Francisco, California in 1904. It has been in continuous operation since its inception. This makes it the second oldest motorcycle club in the United States, preceded only by the Yonkers MC of Yonkers, New York, founded in 1903.

The SFMC has been a member of the American Motorcyclist Association since 1924. Members are not limited to riding any particular make or model of motorcycle and include males and females.

Interesting facts
San Francisco Mayor P.H. McCarthy was an SFMC member in 1911
An SFMC member, Hap Jones was the first civilian to cross the Golden Gate Bridge upon its completion in 1937. He reenacted this event in 1987 for the 50 Year Anniversary of the famous bridge.

Presidents 
Presidents of the San Francisco Motorcycle Club have included:

 2002 Frank Morales
 2003 Frank Morales
 2004 Dennis Casey
 2005 Eric Schiller
 2006 Eric Schiller
 2007 Chuck Dobbins
 2008 Tegan Hetzel-Dobbins
 2009 Stephan Kokinda
 2010 Bob Young
 2011 Brian Holm
 2012 Kalle Hoffman
 2013 John A. Sweeny
 2014 Tucker Perry
 2015 Ben Berliner
 2016 Ben Berliner
 2017 Barry Synoground
 2018 Dennis Casey
 2019 Darrell Scarlet
 2020 David Simpson
 2021 David Simpson
 2022 Jane Williamson

References

External links
San Francisco Motorcycle Club Official Site

1904 establishments in California
Motorcycle clubs in the United States